Maratus is a spider genus of the family Salticidae (jumping spiders). These spiders are commonly referred to as peacock spiders due to the males' colorful and usually iridescent patterns on the upper surface of the abdomen often enhanced with lateral flaps or bristles, which they display during courtship. Females lack these bright colors, being cryptic in appearance. In at least one species, Maratus vespertilio, the expansion of the flaps also occurs during ritualised contests between males. The male display and courtship dance are complex, involving visual and vibratory signals.

Several species in this genus were earlier classified in the genus Saitis, containing the Mediterranean Saitis barbipes, which is superficially similar to Maratus (colorful males with an enlarged third pair of legs). Saitis in Australia have enlarged and fringed third legs which they use for display but do not raise their abdomens like Maratus. All species of Maratus are found in Australia, with the exception of Maratus furvus from China. M. furvus was first described in 1992 in the genus Lycidas, becoming part of Maratus when Lycidas was synonymized in 2012. Otto and Hill consider this species cannot be linked to any genus with certainty.

Description 
Maratus species are small spiders, with a total body length mostly around 4–5 mm (0.2 in), sometimes smaller, with a high degree of sexual dimorphism. They are known as peacock spiders, based on the peacock-like display of the dorsal (upper) surface of the abdomen (opisthosoma) of the males, on which there is a "plate" or "fan" of usually brightly colored and highly iridescent scales and hairs, often forming patterns in which the foreground colors contrast with the iridescent background. There may in addition be "flaps" or dense fringes of hairs at the sides of the abdomen, sometimes brightly colored. In both sexes, the abdomen is joined to the cephalothorax by a long and very flexible pedicel. This allows males to raise their abdomens, which may also be capable of being flattened and waved from side to side, thus emphasizing the appearance of the dorsal pattern. Not all species have colors that appear bright to human vision; Maratus vespertilio is relatively cryptically colored, with most iridescence on the lateral flaps. The abdominal display is used in courtship and, in at least one species, also in aggressive interactions with rival males. If the male continues his dance when the female is not interested, she will often attempt to attack, kill, and feed on him; she may also do this after mating (sexual cannibalism). If the female is already mated, then she will appear more aggressive, and less receptive to other males' displays. This can also occur if the female simply was not impressed by the male (less vibrations or less leg waving). She has an anti-receptivity signal that tells males she is not receptive. This serves a function to both the males and females. The males will stop wasting their energy on an unwilling female. The male’s display is likely to attract predators, so stopping the performance is likely to protect both the female and male from potential dangers. In almost all species, males have relatively long third legs, often brightly patterned, that are also used in courtship displays. Salticid spiders have excellent vision, with the ability to see in at least two colors: green and ultraviolet (UV). The male display includes vibratory signals in addition to visual ones. At least one species (Maratus fimbriatus) displays with its first pair of legs rather than its third pair. Some Maratus including Maratus calcitrans, Maratus digitatus and Maratus jactatus display with greatly enlarged and decorated spinnerets when their abdomen is elevated. One species from Cape Riche, Western Australia, in a region which is something of a hot-spot for Maratus species, does not use its abdomen in its display at all, instead using a combination of decorated third legs and its bright blue face and fluffy white pedipalps.

Male palpal bulbs are relatively simple in appearance, with a circular embolus, and are rather similar in different species. The palp usually has a simple retrolateral tibial apophysis with a blunt tip.

In contrast to the brightly coloured and distinctive males, females are cryptic or camouflaged in appearance, with mottled patterns of whitish and brownish scales. The epigyne is simple, with a pair of circular "windows" (fossae) to the front and a pair of oval spermathecae to the rear. The long and flexible pedicel allows females to rotate their abdomens by more than 180° during mating.

Mechanisms used in colour production 
Male Maratus species mostly display the brilliantly coloured upper surface of their abdomen, often with extensions and fringes, to the females in courtship dances. Colours are produced by two main methods using scales (or modified hairs). One mechanism uses pigments to produce reds, whites, and creams in barbed scales that help scatter light. To produce blues the spiders use arrays of nanostructures reflecting light of particular wavelengths, in the case of Maratus splendens a shiny, sometimes violet blue. The nanostructures are embedded in flat, convex, sac-like scales, amplifying reflected light, according to University of Groningen’s Doekele Stavenga. This is the only animal where this kind of reflection has been shown. Stavenga compared Maratus colours with patterns on butterfly wings, the colors of flowers, and the feathers of the parotia bird. The blues produced by nanostructures in Maratus do not fade over time, unlike the normal pigmenting method. Other blue animals, like beetles, are rare but also use nanostructures. Nathan Morehouse of the University of Pittsburgh found Maratus volans have four different photoreceptors (tetrachromats) allowing them to see red, blue, green, and ultraviolet and also resolve the intricacies of the male’s display designs.

Taxonomy 
The genus Maratus was first described by Ferdinand Karsch in 1878. Karsch was a curator at the Museum für Naturkunde, Berlin, and named spiders and other animals from preserved specimens collected by others. He described the species Maratus amabilis, the type of his new genus, on the basis of a single male specimen, whose origin was only recorded as "Australia". His short description mentioned the abdomen being flattened and quadrangular in shape, but otherwise did not refer to the characteristic abdominal "flaps". In a footnote, he also named Maratus amoenus (now M. volans).  in 1987 was the first to restore Karsch's two species of Maratus, and moving more previously described species to the genus in 1991. Maratus was greatly expanded in the 21st century, both by known species being moved to Maratus and by the description of new species. Most of the new species have been described by Jürgen C. Otto and David E. Hill.

Otto and Hill suggest that Maratus is closely related to the genus Saitis. Both are found in Australia, and in both genera the males have elongated third legs and unmodified first legs.

Phylogeny 
The relationships among Maratus and related genera are unclear, and many species await description. Otto and Hill synonymized Lycidas with Maratus) in 2012 recognising the type species for Lycidas, Lycidas anomalus was actually a Maratus, thus causing all then named Lycidas to be subsumed by Maratus. They hypothesize that the remaining genera may be related as shown below: 
One molecular phylogenetic study, by Junxia Zhang in 2012, concluded that the seven Australian genera Hypoblemum, Jotus, Lycidas, Maileus, Maratus, Saitis and Prostheclina were so closely related that they could all be accommodated in Saitis but this suggestion has not been carried through to any taxonomic publication. In the Saitis group, the third leg is longer and the first leg unspecialized. In the Jotus group the first leg is longer and specialized. In both Maratus and some Hypoblemum in the Maratus group, the abdomen is raised during courtship, but only Maratus has a colorful dorsal plate.

Species 
 it contains 108 species:

 Maratus albus Otto & Hill, 2016 – Western Australia, South Australia
 Maratus amabilis Karsch, 1878 (type species) – Australia
 Maratus ammophilus Otto & Hill, 2022 – Western Australia
 Maratus anomaliformis (Zabka, 1987) – Queensland
 Maratus anomalus (Karsch, 1878) – Queensland, New South Wales
 Maratus aquilus Schubert, 2019 – Western Australia
 Maratus aurantius Otto & Hill, 2017 – New South Wales
 Maratus australis Otto & Hill, 2016 – Western Australia
 Maratus avibus Otto & Hill, 2014 – Western Australia
 Maratus azureus Schubert, 2020 – Western Australia
 Maratus banyowla Otto & Hill, 2019 – Western Australia
 Maratus bitaeniatus (Keyserling, 1882) – Australia
 Maratus boranup Otto & Hill, 2018 – Western Australia
 Maratus bubo Otto & Hill, 2016 – Western Australia
 Maratus caeruleus Waldock, 2013 – Western Australia
 Maratus calcitrans Otto & Hill, 2012 – New South Wales, Australian Capital Territory, Victoria
 Maratus candens Otto & Hill, 2022 – Western Australia
 Maratus chlorophthalmus (Simon, 1909) – Western Australia
 Maratus chrysomelas (Simon, 1909) – Queensland, Western Australia, New South Wales, Victoria
 Maratus cinereus Otto & Hill, 2017 – Queensland
 Maratus clupeatus Otto & Hill, 2014 – Western Australia
 Maratus combustus Schubert, 2019 – Western Australia
 Maratus constellatus Schubert, 2020 – Western Australia
 Maratus cristatus Otto & Hill, 2017 – Western Australia
 Maratus cuspis Otto & Hill, 2019 – Western Australia
 Maratus digitatus Otto & Hill, 2012 – Queensland, New South Wales
 Maratus electricus Otto & Hill, 2017 – Western Australia
 Maratus elephans Otto & Hill, 2015 – New South Wales
 Maratus eliasi Baehr & Whyte, 2016 – Queensland
 Maratus expolitus Prasad, 2022 – Queensland, New South Wales, Victoria
 Maratus felinus Schubert, 2019 – Western Australia
 Maratus fimbriatus Otto & Hill, 2016 – New South Wales
 Maratus flavus Otto & Hill, 2018 – Western Australia
 Maratus fletcheri Waldock, 2020 – Western Australia
 Maratus furvus (Song & Chai, 1992) – China
 Maratus gemmifer Otto & Hill, 2017 – Western Australia
 Maratus griseus (Keyserling, 1882) – Australia, New Zealand
 Maratus harrisi Otto & Hill, 2011 – Australian Capital Territory, Tasmania
 Maratus harveryi Waldock, 2020 – Western Australia
 Maratus hesperus (Otto & Hill, 2017) – Queensland, New South Wales, Victoria
 Maratus heteropogon (Simon, 1909) – Western Australia
 Maratus hortorum Waldock, 2014 – Western Australia
 Maratus icarus Otto & Hill, 2019 – Western Australia
 Maratus inaquosus Schubert, 2020 – Victoria
 Maratus jactatus Otto & Hill, 2015 – Queensland
 Maratus julianneae Baehr & Whyte, 2016 – Queensland 
 Maratus karrie Waldock, 2013 – Western Australia
 Maratus kiwirrkurra Baehr & Whyte, 2016 – Western Australia
 Maratus karschi (Zabka, 1987) – New South Wales
 Maratus kiwirrkurra Baehr & Whyte, 2016 – Queensland 
 Maratus kochi (Zabka, 1987) – Australia
 Maratus laurenae Schubert, 2020 – Western Australia
 Maratus lentus Otto & Hill, 2017 – New South Wales
 Maratus leo Otto & Hill, 2014 – South Australia
 Maratus linnaei Waldock, 2008 – Western Australia
 Maratus literatus Otto & Hill, 2014 – New South Wales
 Maratus lobatus Otto & Hill, 2016 – Western Australia, South Australia
 Maratus madelineae Waldock, 2014 – Western Australia
 Maratus maritimus Otto & Hill, 2014 – Western Australia
 Maratus melindae Waldock, 2013 – Western Australia
 Maratus melindae corus Otto & Hill, 2017 – Western Australia
 Maratus michaelorum Baehr & Whyte, 2016 – Queensland 
 Maratus michaelseni (Simon, 1909) – Western Australia
 Maratus montanus Otto & Hill, 2014 – Western Australia
 Maratus mungaich Waldock, 1995 – Western Australia
 Maratus nemo Schubert, 2021 – South Australia
 Maratus neptunus Otto & Hill, 2017 – New South Wales
 Maratus nigriceps (Keyserling, 1882) – Queensland
 Maratus nigromaculatus (Keyserling, 1883) – Queensland
 Maratus nimbus Otto & Hill, 2017 – Southern Australia
 Maratus noggerup Schubert, 2020 – Western Australia
 Maratus nubilis Otto & Hill, 2022 – Western Australia
 Maratus obscurior (Simon, 1909) – Western Australia
 Maratus occasus Schubert, 2019 – Queensland
 Maratus ottoi Baehr & Whyte, 2016 – Queensland 
 Maratus pardus Otto & Hill, 2014 – Western Australia
 Maratus pavonis (Dunn, 1947) – Western Australia, New South Wales, Victoria, Tasmania
 Maratus personatus Otto & Hill, 2015 – Western Australia
 Maratus piliger (Keyserling, 1882) – Queensland
 Maratus pilosus (Keyserling, 1882) – Queensland
 Maratus pinniger Otto & Hill, 2022 – Western Australia
 Maratus plumosus Otto & Hill, 2013 – Queensland, New South Wales, Victoria
 Maratus proszynskii Waldock, 2015 – Tasmania
 Maratus purcellae Otto & Hill, 2013 – New South Wales, Australian Capital Territory
 Maratus rainbowi Roewer, 1951 (replacement name, synonym Maratus splendens) – Western Australia, New South Wales, Victoria
 Maratus robinsoni Otto & Hill, 2012 – New South Wales
 Maratus sagittus Schubert & Whyte, 2019 – Queensland
 Maratus sapphirus Otto & Hill, 2017 – New South Wales
 Maratus sarahae Waldock, 2013 – Western Australia
 Maratus sceletus Otto & Hill, 2015 – Queensland
 Maratus scutulatus (L. Koch, 1881) – Australia. Introduced to New Zealand
 Maratus speciosus (O. Pickard-Cambridge, 1874) – Western Australia
 Maratus speculifer (Simon, 1909) – Western Australia
 Maratus spicatus Otto & Hill, 2012 – Western Australia
 Maratus suae Schubert, 2020 – Western Australia
 Maratus sylvestris Otto & Hill, 2019 – New South Wales
 Maratus tasmanicus Otto & Hill, 2013 – Western Australia, Tasmania
 Maratus tessellatus Otto & Hill, 2016 – Western Australia
 Maratus tiddalik Otto & Hill, 2020 – Western Australia
 Maratus tortus Otto & Hill, 2018 – Western Australia
 Maratus trigonus Otto & Hill, 2017 – Western Australia
 Maratus unicup Otto & Hill, 2018 – Western Australia
 Maratus velutinus Otto & Hill, 2012 – New South Wales
 Maratus vespa Otto & Hill, 2016 – Western Australia
 Maratus vespertilio (Simon, 1901) – Australia
 Maratus vittatus (Keyserling, 1881) – Queensland
 Maratus volans (O. Pickard-Cambridge, 1874) – Queensland, New South Wales, Victoria
 Maratus volpei Schubert, 2020 – South Australia
 Maratus vultus Otto & Hill, 2016 – Western Australia, Victoria
 Maratus watagansi Otto & Hill, 2013 – New South Wales

Nomenclature 
Early scientific names mostly used Latin or Greek descriptors, for example the type species Maratus amabilis (1878) refers to the friendly or pleasant Maratus. Maratus volans (1874) means the flying Maratus, reflecting the mistaken belief this species (and indeed the genus) could fly by means of its extended abdominal flap. We now know they cannot fly and the flap is used in courtship or (in at least one case) ritualised combat. Maratus chrysomelas refers to the golden yellow iridescence of the abdomen when viewed at some angles. In 1947 Dunn used the species name pavonis meaning peacock. Zabka and Waldock continued the tradition of using Latin and Greek in the 1980s and 1990s as did Otto & Hill from 2011 on, also using a patronym for Stuart Harris in the case of Maratus harrisi. As Peacock Spiders became more popular, so did patronyms, with Maratus purcellae for its discoverer Otto & Hill 2013 and Maratus proszynski for Jerzy Prószyński Waldock 2015. Common names featured in news media gained traction, particularly with Sparklemuffin for Maratus jactatus. In July 2016, Barbara Baehr and Robert Whyte from the Queensland Museum announced a newly discovered species to be named Maratus licunxin or Maratus licunxini after the artistic director of the Queensland Ballet, Li Cunxin and honoured Jürgen Otto with Maratus ottoi, Michael Duncan and Michael Doe with Maratus michaelorum, and Julianne Waldock with Maratus julianneae.

Maratus splendens and Maratus rainbowi refer to the same, single species, both listed here. Otto & Hill, when describing the female for the first time chose to continue to use Rainbow's Maratus splendens rather than Roewer's replacement name Maratus rainbowi. While Maratus rainbowi still appears in a number of on-line catalogs, all published descriptions and studies of this spider to date have used the original name Maratus splendens, the replacement name never having gained currency, and no longer preoccupied.

In 2017 Jurgen Otto and David Hill published a Catalogue of the Australian peacock spiders (Araneae: Salticidae: Euophryini: Maratus, Saratus) in Peckhamia, having also recently erected a new genus for peacock spiders with significantly different genitalia to Maratus, being Saratus Otto & Hill, 2017.

In the catalogue a single species of Saratus is listed, adult males are shown in photographs, range maps shows areas that have been identified in prior publications, or by unpublished observations and posted photographs that the authors consider reliable.

See also 
 Sexual selection in spiders

References

External links 

 Fascinating courtship/mating video of peacock spider, Maratus splendens from the journal Science
Maratus OZCAM occurrence data
Maratus GBIF occurrence data

Salticidae
Salticidae genera
Spiders of Australia
Spiders of China
Taxa named by Ferdinand Karsch